General elections were held in Liechtenstein in March 1932. A new electoral system was introduced in which the Landtag was elected in two rounds. In the first round then members were elected, with every municipality with more than 300 inhabitants electing one member. The second round involved the election of the remaining five Landtag members through a national vote with the whole of Liechtenstein serving as one electoral district.

The first round of the election was held on 6 March with every municipality except Planken electing one Landtag member. The second round was held on 13 March. The result was a victory for the ruling Progressive Citizens' Party, which won 13 of the 15 seats in the Landtag. This was the last election contested by the Christian-Social People's Party before it merged with the Liechtenstein Homeland Service to form the Patriotic Union.

Results

Municipal vote

National vote

References

Liechtenstein
1932 in Liechtenstein
Elections in Liechtenstein
March 1932 events
Election and referendum articles with incomplete results